Glanerbrug is a railway station close to the border of Germany in Glanerbrug, Netherlands. The station opened on 18 November 2001 and is on the Zutphen–Glanerbeek railway. Between the 1972 and 2001, the passenger service to Germany stopped as the line was closed.  The line to Gronau was reopened in 2001. The station is operated by Prorail, but is served by Deutsche Bahn.

The station was originally opened in 1865 as Glanerbeek and closed in 1972.

Bus services

There is no bus service at this station. The nearest bus stop is Tolstraat, 500m south of the station.

References

External links
NS website 
Dutch Public Transport journey planner 

Railway stations in Overijssel
Railway stations opened in 1868
Railway stations closed in 1950
Railway stations opened in 2001
Railway stations on the Staatslijn D
Buildings and structures in Enschede